Magic camp may refer to:

Places
 Tannen's Magic Shop, a camp in the United States for young magicians, held since 1974
 Fantastic Magic Camp, a camp in Texas for children, held since 1993
 Sorcerers Safari Magic Camp, a camp in Canada for young magicians, held since 1996

Films
 Magic Camp, a 2012 documentary film directed by Judd Ehrlich about aspiring magicians attending Tannen's Magic Camp
 Magic Camp (film), an American comedy film about a fictional magic camp